Erdi Öner (born 4 July 1986) is a Turkish professional footballer who most recently played as a defender for Bandırmaspor.

Öner, born in İzmir, spent the first nine years of his career playing for clubs within the province. He joined Kasımpaşa in 2009.

References

1986 births
Living people
Turkish footballers
Göztepe S.K. footballers
Altay S.K. footballers
Kasımpaşa S.K. footballers
Karşıyaka S.K. footballers
Manisaspor footballers
Süper Lig players
TFF First League players
Association football defenders